Thomas McDonald (24 May 1930 – 24 August 2004) was a Scottish footballer who played as a right winger. He made over 200 appearances for a number of different clubs in both the Scottish and English leagues.

Career
McDonald's first professional club were Hibernian, where he made his first senior appearances. In April 1954 he moved to English First Division champions Wolverhampton Wanderers. He struggled to gain first team action at Molineux though, and made just six appearances in total for the club before moving to Leicester City for £6,000 in July 1956.

He made the most appearances of his playing career for Leicester, playing over 100 league games during a four-year stay, and helping them to promotion to the top flight under Dave Halliday.

He returned to his native Scotland in July 1960 when he became Jock Stein's first purchase for Dunfermline Athletic at a cost of £3,000. He missed out on their 1961 Scottish Cup triumph when he suffered appendicitis on the eve of the game.

His playing career wound down with a succession of clubs in quick succession, as he served Raith Rovers, Queen of the South, Stirling Albion and Cowdenbeath, respectively. He retired from playing in 1964 to become the manager of the Fife-based non-league side Oakley United.

References 

1930 births
2004 deaths
People from Cowdenbeath
Scottish footballers
Scotland B international footballers
Hibernian F.C. players
Wolverhampton Wanderers F.C. players
Leicester City F.C. players
Dunfermline Athletic F.C. players
Raith Rovers F.C. players
Queen of the South F.C. players
Stirling Albion F.C. players
Cowdenbeath F.C. players
Association football wingers
Scottish Football League players
English Football League players
Scottish Junior Football Association managers
Scottish football managers
Scottish Junior Football Association players
Hill of Beath Hawthorn F.C. players
Footballers from Fife